Erich Correns (1821–1877) was a German portrait painter and lithographer.

Life
Correns was born at Cologne in 1821, and after studying jurisprudence at Bonn, went to the Academy at Munich, and became an
accomplished portrait painter and lithographer. He was well known for the elegance of his portraits, his subjects including King Maximilian of Bavaria and his consort Queen Maria.

He died at  Munich in 1877.

The botanist and geneticist Karl Erich Correns was his son.

See also
 List of German painters

References

Sources

 

1821 births
1877 deaths
Artists from Cologne
19th-century German painters
19th-century German male artists
German male painters
German portrait painters
Academy of Fine Arts, Munich alumni